Serghei is a Romanian-language male given name:

Serghei Alexeev
Serghei Cleșcenco
Serghei Covalciuc
Serghei Covaliov
Serghei Donico-Iordăchescu
Serghei Dubrovin
Serghei Gafina
Serghei Gheorghiev
Serghei Lașcencov
Serghei Marghiev
Serghei Mariniuc
Serghei Namașco
Serghei Nicolau
Serghei Pașcenco
Serghei Pogreban
Serghei Rogaciov
Serghei Stolearenco
Serghei Stroenco
Serghei Țvetcov

and a Romanian surname:

Larion Serghei
Valentina Serghei
Vasile Serghei

Romanian masculine given names
Romanian-language surnames